Gay sexual practices are sexual activities involving men who have sex with men (MSM), regardless of their sexual orientation or sexual identity. These practices can include anal sex, non-penetrative sex, and oral sex. Evidence shows that sex between men is significantly underreported in surveys.

Behaviors
Various sex positions may be performed during sexual activity between men.  Evidence shows that sex between men is significantly underreported in surveys due to social desirability bias.

Anal sex

Historically, anal sex has been popularly associated with male homosexuality and MSM. Many MSM, however, do not engage in anal sex, and may engage in oral sex, frottage or frot, or mutual masturbation instead.

Among men who have anal sex with other men, the insertive partner may be referred to as the top, the one being penetrated may be referred to as the bottom, and those who enjoy either role may be referred to as versatile. When MSM engage in anal sex without using a condom, this is referred to as bareback sex. Pleasure, pain, or both may accompany anal sex. While the nerve endings in the anus can provide pleasurable feelings, an orgasm may be achieved through receptive anal penetration by indirect stimulation of the prostate. A study by the National Survey of Sexual Health and Behavior (NSSHB) indicated that men who self-report taking a receptive position during anal sex in their last encounter were at least as likely to have reached orgasm as men who adopted an insertive role. A study sampling single people in the U.S. indicated that orgasm rates are similar among men across sexual orientations. With regard to pain or being uncomfortable during anal sex, some research indicates that, for 24% to 61% of gay or bisexual men, painful receptive anal sex (known as anodyspareunia) is a frequent lifetime sexual difficulty.

Reports pertaining to the prevalence of anal sex among MSM have varied over time, with some percentages higher than others. A large percentage of gay and bisexual men self-report lifetime participation in anal sex. Studies among gay men have indicated that  percentages are similar when comparing men who prefer to penetrate their partners to those who prefer to be the receptive partner. Some men who have sex with men, however, believe that being a receptive partner during anal sex questions their masculinity.

Non-penetrative sex and sex toys

There are a variety of non-penetrative sex practices. Frot is a form of male-male sexual activity that usually involves direct penis-to-penis contact. It is a form of frottage. Frot can be enjoyable because it mutually and simultaneously stimulates the genitals of both partners as it tends to produce pleasurable friction against the frenulum nerve bundle on the underside of each man's penile shaft, just below the urinary opening (meatus) of the penis head (glans penis). Intercrural sex is another form of non-penetrative sex that can be practiced between MSM. Docking (the insertion of one man's penis into another man's foreskin) is also practiced.

MSM may use sex toys. According to an online survey of 25,294 men who self-reported a homosexual or bisexual orientation, 49.8% have used vibrators. Most men who had used a vibrator in the past reported use during masturbation (86.2%). When used during partnered interactions, vibrators were incorporated into foreplay (65.9%) and intercourse (59.4%).

Oral sex

MSM may engage in different forms of oral sex, such as fellatio, tea bagging, and anilingus. Wellings et al. reported that "the equation of 'homosexual' with 'anal' sex among men is common among lay and health professionals alike," whereas an online survey of 18,000 MSM in Europe "showed that oral sex was most commonly practised, followed by mutual masturbation, with anal intercourse in third place." A 2011 survey by The Journal of Sexual Medicine found similar results for U.S. gay and bisexual men. Kissing a partner on the mouth (74.5%), oral sex (72.7%), and partnered masturbation (68.4%) were the three most common behaviors, with 63.2% of the sample self-reporting five to nine different sexual behaviors during their last encounter.

Health risks
A variety of sexually transmitted infections (STIs) can result from sexual activity. A 2007 study reported that two large population surveys found "the majority of gay men had similar numbers of unprotected sexual partners annually as straight men and women."

Acquired immune deficiency syndrome (AIDS) is a disease of the human immune system caused by the human immunodeficiency virus (HIV). Worldwide, an estimated 5–10% of HIV infections are the result of men having sex with men. However, in North America and Western and Central Europe, more HIV infections are transmitted by men having sex with men than by any other transmission route in 2009. In the United States, gay and bisexual men accounted for 70% of 38,739 new HIV diagnoses in 2017. Of the 5,164 people diagnosed with HIV in the UK in 2016, 54% were gay or bisexual men. This statistic is decreasing in London as reported by Public Health England in 2017. The relevance of HIV among gay men and other men who have sex with men may be partially explained by gender norms that prioritize male strength and stoicism, which delay men from seeking care. HIV prevention services coverage is still low for gay men and other men who have sex with men, including in many high-income countries.

Syphilis is passed from person to person through direct contact with a syphilis sore; mainly on the external genitals, the vagina, or anus. In 2006, 64% of the reported cases in the United States were among men who have sex with men. A rise in the incidence of syphilis among MSM has been seen in other developed nations. Contracting syphilis increases the rates of HIV contamination and vice versa, and accordingly a survey in the US has indeed found that half MSM with syphilis also possess HIV. Some studies utilizing convenience samples have concluded that such rise can be attributed to increased rates of sex without a condom among MSM, though at least one study using a nationally representative sample has found that condom use rates among MSM have increased, not decreased, in the last decade, and there has been a steep decline in the frequency of anal sex in the last sexual encounter of active MSM.

According to a US survey, HIV, syphilis, and anal warts are all significantly more common among men who recently had sex with men (MSM) than among men who recently had sex only with women (MSW). On the other hand, genital herpes is less common among MSM than among MSW. Chlamydia, human papillomavirus, gonorrhea, and lice saw no significant difference across the two groups.

Legality

Some or all sexual acts between men are currently or were formerly classified as crimes in jurisdictions of some countries. In its December 2020 report, ILGA found that certain sexual acts between men are criminalized in 67 of 193 UN member states and one non-independent jurisdiction, the Cook Islands, while two UN member states, Iraq and Egypt, criminalize it de facto but not in legislation. In Egypt, there is no law against homosexuality but gay and bisexual men are prosecuted under other laws, most famously the Cairo 52. In at least six UN member states—Brunei, Iran, Mauritania, Nigeria (only northern Nigeria), Saudi Arabia and Yemen—it is punishable by death. In 2007, five countries executed someone as a penalty for homosexual acts. In 2020, ILGA named Iran and Saudi Arabia as the only countries in which executions for same-sex activity have reportedly taken place. In other countries, such as Yemen and Iraq, extrajudicial executions are carried out by militias such as Islamic State or Al-Qaeda. Many other countries had such laws in the past, but they were repealed, especially since 1945. Such laws are inherently difficult to enforce; more often than not, they are not commonly enforced.

See also

Bisexuality
Men who have sex with men
Lesbian sexual practices
Homosexuality

References

External links

Male homosexuality
Sexual acts